is a Japanese voice actress from Kagoshima Prefecture, Japan. She voiced Karin in Naruto: Shippuden and Ivy Valentine in Soulcalibur.

Filmography

Anime

Video games

Overseas dubbing

References

External links
 Official agency profile 
 
 

1984 births
Living people
Japanese video game actresses
Japanese voice actresses
Voice actresses from Kagoshima Prefecture
21st-century Japanese actresses